Joni Mitchell Archives – Vol. 1: The Early Years (1963–1967) is a five-disc box set by Canadian singer-songwriter Joni Mitchell, released on October 30, 2020, by Rhino Records. The box set is the first release of the Joni Mitchell Archives, a planned series of releases containing remastered material from the singer's archives. Formatted in chronological order, the first volume of the series includes the archived material that was recorded in the years preceding the release of Mitchell's debut studio album, Song to a Seagull (1968). The album won the Grammy Award for Best Historical Album at the 64th Annual Grammy Awards.

Background and recording
In 1963, now-retired radio DJ Barry Bowman of CFQC 600 lived with three of his friends in downtown Saskatoon, Canada. During that summer, Bowman and his friends met and befriended Joni Mitchell, who at the time was still going by her birth name of Joni Anderson. The group would frequently congregate with Mitchell at the large house they were renting, the local swimming pool, or the South Saskatchewan River, where they "drank beer and ate hot dogs." One of Bowman's friends and co-tenants, Danny Evanishen, referred to that period of time as being "the summer that Joni came to [them]." Evanishen is also attributed as being the person who encouraged Mitchell to take up playing the guitar, loaning her his guitar to play in lieu of her ukulele. Encouraged by Mitchell's budding talent, Bowman invited her to the radio station to record nine traditional folk songs over the course of two nights. He gave her a copy of the audition tape and kept the masters, which were later unearthed by his ex-wife in 2015.

In addition to Bowman's rediscovered master tapes, the box set also contains a number of recordings from Mitchell's personal archive, including an expansive, three-set recording captured at the Canterbury House student missionary in Ann Arbor, Michigan, in 1967. The Canterbury House recording made headlines when it was unearthed with lost Neil Young recordings in 2018 by the Michigan History Project. Young ended up being a consultant during the assemblage of the Archive Collection's inaugural release, having had experience with the release of his own extensive archival series, though the project was ultimately spearheaded by Mitchell and Young's late manager Elliot Roberts, who died during the process of planning the release, and to whom the release is dedicated. Planning for the release continued throughout the COVID-19 pandemic, with in-person meetings between Mitchell and label personnel transitioning to telephone and video calls.

In the press release announcing the creation of the Joni Mitchell Archives and the release of the first volume, Mitchell included a statement that emphasized the introspective importance of the revisitation of her earliest recordings:

Critical reception

Upon release, Joni Mitchell Archives – Vol. 1: The Early Years (1963–1967) received critical acclaim from music critics. At Metacritic, which assigns a normalized rating out of 100 to reviews from mainstream critics, the album has an average score of 87 based on 6 reviews, indicating "universal acclaim".

In a positive review for The New York Times, Lindsay Zoladz called the collection "A thorough but imposing six hours of material [that] is less about any specific unearthed gem than the larger transformation it charts." She took a special liking to The Canterbury House live recordings on the last two discs, saying they "[showcase] a performer with lifetimes' more wisdom than the happy-to-be-here ingénue of 1963." AllMusic senior editor Stephen Thomas Erlewine gave the box set four-and-a-half out of five stars, saying that it "fills in an important chapter that heretofore has gone undocumented through in [Joni's] official discography: her formative years as a folkie, playing intimate venues and radio stations while recording the occasional demo or gift tape at home." For this reason, coupled with Joni's "evolution" into a fully-fledged artist over the duration of the recordings, Erlewine determines that the release is "a biography in the form of archival tapes" that is "historically important" and "absorbing on a sheer musical level". David Browne of Rolling Stone gave the album a four-out-of-five rating, though he thought the set could use some "pruning", writing that it was not apparent as to "why we need to hear multiple versions of some of these songs—three each of "Urge for Going" and "Both Sides Now," none of which is dramatically different." However, in the end, he concluded that the set had "gems ... scattered throughout", and called the last two discs "the keepers". A review in Mojo said that the set "[enhances] the listener's wonder at her rapid evolution" and compared Mitchell's artistic growth as going from "shoreline to treetops in under four years".

Aside from the warm critical reception, the album received a Grammy Award for Best Historical Album at the 64th Annual Grammy Awards in 2022.

Track listing
All tracks are written by Joni Mitchell, except where noted.

Disc 1

Disc 2

Disc 3

Disc 4

Disc 5

Personnel
Credits adapted from Discogs.

Performers
 Joni Mitchell – vocals; guitar; bass

Production and recording
 Barry Bowman – recording
 Bernie Grundman – mastering
 Joni Mitchell – compilation producer
 Patrick Milligan – compilation producer
 J. Robinson – recording
 Thomas Root – recording
 Ed Sciaky – recording

Design
 Joel Bernstein – photography; research
 Al Blixt – photography
 Cameron Crowe – interviewer; liner notes
 Sheryl Farber – supervision
 Lisa Glines – art direction; design
 Edwin C. Lombardo – photography
 Joni Mitchell – cover illustration; interviewee
 Doran Tyson – product manager
 Shannon Ward – packaging manager

Charts

Highlights

A condensed version of Joni Mitchell Archives – Vol. 1: The Early Years (1963–1967), subtitled Highlights, was released on June 12, 2021, by Rhino Records. The sampler album was released exclusively as a vinyl LP for Record Store Day 2021 Drop 1. Highlights is the fourth overall release and second auxiliary release of the Joni Mitchell Archives, and like the album its material is derived from, features a track listing that is in chronological order. The 180 gram vinyl was limited to 5,500 copies in the United States and 15,000 copies worldwide.

Track listing

Charts

References

Joni Mitchell albums
2020 albums
Grammy Award for Best Historical Album